"End of the Road" is a song by American R&B group Boyz II Men for the Boomerang soundtrack. It was released in June 1992, and is written by Babyface, Antonio L.A. Reid and Daryl Simmons. The song achieved domestic and international success. In the United States, it spent a then record breaking 13 weeks at number one on the US Billboard Hot 100, a record broken later in the year by Whitney Houston's 14-week number one hit "I Will Always Love You"; Boyz II Men would later match Houston's record with "I'll Make Love to You", which spent 14 weeks at number one in 1994, and then reclaim the record with "One Sweet Day" (a duet with Mariah Carey), which spent 16 weeks at number one from 1995 to 1996.

"End of the Road" was the number one single of 1992 on the Billboard Year-End Hot 100 Singles of 1992. It was also ranked by Billboard as the sixth most successful song of the decade 1990–1999. Internationally, it reached number one in Australia, United Kingdom and the Hot 100 Eurochart, among others. "End of the Road" has been certified Platinum by the Recording Industry Association of America for shipments of over one million units in the United States. The song also won Best R&B Performance by a Duo or Group with Vocals and Best R&B Song at the 1993 Grammy Awards. It is written and composed in the key of E-flat major and is set in time signature of 6/8 with a tempo of 150 beats per minute.

Release and chart performance
"End of the Road" was released on June 30, 1992. It was released as a single from the Boomerang soundtrack and did not originally appear on Boyz II Men's debut album, Cooleyhighharmony. It was released after all singles from their debut had been released, and was their fifth single overall. However, Cooleyhighharmony was re-issued in 1992 and 1993 to include "End of the Road" due to the success of the single.

The single debuted at number 53 on the Billboard Hot 100 on July 18, 1992, jumping to number 30 the following week. The next week the song reached the top ten at number 8, and reached the top five the week after at number 4. The following week, the song peaked at number one, holding the position for 13 consecutive weeks from August 15, 1992 to November 7, 1992. On November 14, the song was finally succeeded by "How Do You Talk to an Angel" by the Heights. It also spent four weeks atop of the Billboard Hot R&B/Hip-Hop Songs chart.

Critical reception
Larry Flick from Billboard commented, "Good to hear something new by this wonderfully talented group." He described the song as a "retrominded pop/R&B tune", adding that "those now-recognizable harmonies glide over a swaying, doo-wop melody, making the track the perfect complement to a romantic evening. Has the markings of a major multiformat smash." British magazine Music Week wrote, "A superior if stylised ballad, with some classically soulful crooning and a smoothly polished finish, it looks set for major success here too. Cute acapella end adds to appeal." Jonathan Bernstein from Spin viewed it as "lugubrious".

Awards and nominations
1993 Grammy Awards
Best R&B Performance by a Duo or Group With Vocal – Boyz II Men – "End of the Road" (winner)
Best R&B Song – Babyface, Daryl Simmons, L.A. Reid – "End of the Road" (winner)

Track listings
 US 7" single
 "End of the Road" (Radio edit w/ Acapella End) — 4:13
 "1-4-All-4-1" East Coast Family — 4:14

 Europe/UK/Australia CD 
 "End of the Road" (Pop Edit) 	3:39 	
 "End of the Road" (Radio Edit w/ Acapella End) 	4:13 	
 "End of the Road" (LP Version) 	5:50 	
 "End of the Road" (Instrumental) 	5:16

 Cassette single
A. "End of the Road" (LP Version) 		
B. "End of the Road" (Instrumental Version)

Charts

Weekly charts

Year-end charts

Decade-end charts

All-time charts

Certifications

Covers
The song has been covered by various artists both domestically and internationally including the Korean group BTS and the a cappella country group Home Free. and a punk rock group, Me First And The Gimme Gimmes on their fourth album, Take a Break.

See also
List of Billboard Hot 100 number-one singles of 1992
List of number-one R&B singles of 1992 (U.S.)
List of number-one singles in 1992 (New Zealand)
List of number-one singles from the 1990s (UK)
List of European number-one hits of 1992
Dutch Top 40 number-one hits of 1992
List of number-one singles in Australia during the 1990s

References

External links
  / VEVO official channel
 
  (Promotional version)
  (Japanese version)
  (Spanish version)
  (2008 single in UK)
 List of cover versions of "End of the Road" at SecondHandSongs.com

1992 songs
1992 singles
1990s ballads
Contemporary R&B ballads
A cappella songs
Boyz II Men songs
Songs written by Daryl Simmons
Songs written by L.A. Reid
Songs written by Babyface (musician)
Spanish-language songs
Billboard Hot 100 number-one singles
Dutch Top 40 number-one singles
European Hot 100 Singles number-one singles
Irish Singles Chart number-one singles
UK Singles Chart number-one singles
Canadian Singles Chart number-one singles
Number-one singles in Australia
Number-one singles in the Netherlands
Number-one singles in New Zealand
Song recordings produced by Babyface (musician)
Song recordings produced by Daryl Simmons
LaFace Records singles
Arista Records singles
Motown singles